is a railway station in the city of Tamura, Fukushima Prefecture, Fukushima Prefecture, Japan, operated by East Japan Railway Company (JR East).

Lines

Station layout
The station has a single island platform connected to the station building by a level crossing. The station is staffed.

Platforms

History
Kanmata Station opened on March 21, 1915. The station was absorbed into the JR East network upon the privatization of the Japanese National Railways (JNR) on April 1, 1987. A new station building was completed in 1991.

Passenger statistics
In fiscal 2018, the station was used by an average of 148 passengers daily (boarding passengers only).

Surrounding area
former Takine Town Hall
Takine Post Office
Abukuma-do

See also
 List of Railway Stations in Japan

References

External links

  

Stations of East Japan Railway Company
Railway stations in Fukushima Prefecture
Ban'etsu East Line
Railway stations in Japan opened in 1915
Tamura, Fukushima